Kholeh Kahush-e Sofla (also Romanized as Kholeh Kāhūsh-e Soflá; also known as Kholeh Gūsh-e Soflá) is a village in Gurani Rural District, Gahvareh District, Dalahu County, Kermanshah Province, Iran. At the 2006 census, its population was 8, in 5 families.

References 

Populated places in Dalahu County